Banksia tortifolia is a small, spreading, prostrate shrub that is endemic to the southwest of Western Australia. It has short underground stems, pinnatipartite leaves with sharply-pointed, linear lobes on each side, greenish-cream, yellow and pink flowers in heads of about eighty, and glabrous, egg-shaped follicles.

Description
There are between forty and eighty-five sharply-pointed, twisted, linear lobes on each side of the leaves.

Taxonomy and naming
This species was first formally described in 1855 by Carl Meissner from an unpublished description by Richard Kippist. Meissner's description was published in Hooker's Journal of Botany and Kew Garden Miscellany as Dryandra tortifolia.

In 1870, George Bentham demoted it to Dryandra arctotidis var. tortifolia in Flora Australiensis but in 1999 Alex George in 1999 resurrected the species D. tortifolia.

In 2007 Austin Mast and Kevin Thiele transferred all dryandras to the genus Banksia and renamed this species Banksia tortifolia.

Distribution and habitat
Banksia tortifolia grows in kwongan between Eneabba and Cataby.

Conservation status
This banksia is classified as "not threatened" by the Western Australian Government Department of Parks and Wildlife.

References 

 

tortifolia
Plants described in 1855
Taxa named by Carl Meissner